Samuel Perry "Powhatan" Carter (August 6, 1819 – May 26, 1891) was a United States naval officer who served in the Union Army as a brevet major general during the American Civil War and became a rear admiral in the postbellum United States Navy. He was the first and thus far only United States officer to have been commissioned both a general officer and a Naval flag officer. C.f.: Joseph D. Stewart, Major General (United States Marine Corps) and Vice Admiral (United States Maritime Service), the USMS being a civilian agency. C.f. also: Rear Admiral and Brigadier General Raphael Semmes, Confederate States Navy and Army.

Early life and career

Carter was born in Elizabethton, Tennessee, the eldest son of Alfred Moore Carter, a direct descendant of the early settlers for whom Carter County is named. His mother was Evalina Belmont Perry. Although later known as Samuel Powhatan Carter, Samuel's given middle name was Perry. He had two brothers, William Blount Carter and James Patton Taylor Carter. Samuel Carter attended the Duffield Academy in Elizabethton, Washington College in Limestone, and Princeton University before enlisting in the U.S. Navy in February 1840. 

Serving as a midshipman, Carter's five years of service included duty in the Pacific and Great Lakes region before transferring to the United States Naval Academy. He graduated in the class of 1846, later seeing action during the Mexican–American War aboard the USS Ohio at the Battle of Veracruz.

Stationed at the United States Naval Observatory for several years following the war, Carter became an assistant professor of mathematics at the United States Naval Academy for three years, from 1850 to 1853. After another tour of duty with the Pacific and Brazil Squadrons, he served in various duties before winning promotion to lieutenant in April 1855. The following year, Carter was present aboard the USS San Jacinto during the bombardment of Chinese coastal fortifications before returning to the United States to be appointed to the staff at the U.S. Naval Academy, remaining at this tour of duty until 1860.

Civil War

In early 1861, after receiving a letter from Carter assuring his loyalty to the Union should a civil war break out, Tennessee senator Andrew Johnson used his influence in the War Department for Carter to be detached from the Navy. Carter was ordered to organize and enlist Unionists within his native East Tennessee, where the majority of the population remained loyal. When Confederate occupation of the region prevented this, Carter raised a brigade of infantry from among the hundreds of East Tennesseans fleeing to Kentucky. During this time he adopted "Powhatan" as a code name when corresponding secretly with Unionists who remained behind Confederate lines. Carter's younger brother, William B. Carter (1820–1902), planned and coordinated the East Tennessee bridge-burning conspiracy in late 1861.

Carter was appointed a brigadier general of volunteers without resigning from the Navy. He led an infantry brigade at the Battle of Mill Springs on January 19, 1862, and participated in operations under Brigadier General George W. Morgan that resulted in the occupation of Cumberland Gap on June 17, 1862. Carter's hope that Morgan would then invade and occupy East Tennessee was dashed when Morgan was forced to retreat in the face of a Confederate move into Kentucky—Braxton Bragg's Perryville Campaign.

Following Bragg's defeat and retreat to Middle Tennessee, Carter successfully lobbied his superiors for permission to conduct a raid into East Tennessee. Carter's plan was to cripple the vital East Tennessee and Virginia Railroad. This would support the operations of Major General William S. Rosecrans in Middle Tennessee, and test the route through the mountains as a potential path of invasion. The result was the first long-range, large-scale Federal cavalry raid of the war. With a force of just under 1,000 men Carter moved through the rugged mountains of eastern Kentucky and Tennessee during the last week of 1862. On December 30 he destroyed railroad and wagon bridges at both Union and Carter's Depot (present day Watauga), Tennessee. He repeatedly defeated the Confederate forces in his path, captured a moving train, destroyed tens of thousands of dollars of military stores, and returned safely to Kentucky on January 2, 1863. Plans to follow the raid with an invasion and occupation of East Tennessee, a move urged by Lincoln, were canceled when Carter reported the route impracticable for a large force.

In July 1863, Carter was placed in command of the XXIII Corps cavalry division and continued campaigning across Tennessee throughout the year, engaging Confederate forces during the Battle of Blue Springs of the Knoxville Campaign.

By 1865, Carter was in North Carolina and commanding the left wing of the Union forces at the Battle of Wyse Fork. He was promoted to brevet major general of volunteers on March 13, 1865, briefly commanding the XXIII Corps before being mustered out of volunteer service in January 1866.

While Carter was serving in the Union Army, the U.S. Navy promoted him to lieutenant commander in 1863, then to commander in 1865.

Postbellum career

Returning to naval service, Carter was appointed a commander due to his military record during the Civil War. Rejoining the Pacific Squadron, he commanded the USS Monocacy. He was promoted to captain in October 1870, served as commandant of midshipman in the Naval Academy until 1873, and returned to sea duty in Europe before being named a member of the Lighthouse Board in 1877.

After the Civil War, Carter became a Veteran Companion of the Military Order of the Loyal Legion of the United States (MOLLUS), a military society composed of Union officers and their descendants.

In 1877, Carter married Martha Custis Williams (1827–1899), a descendant of Martha Custis Washington. Promoted to commodore in November 1878, Carter retired in August 1881, shortly before being promoted to rear admiral on the retired list in May 1882. He lived in retirement until his death in Washington, D.C. Carter is buried in the Oak Hill Cemetery.

A Tennessee Historical Marker located on West Elk Avenue in front of the S. P. Carter home in downtown Elizabethton, Tennessee, commemorates his life and naval career.

Dates of rank
Midshipman – 14 February 1840
Passed Midshipman – 11 July 1846
Master – 12 September 1854
Lieutenant – 18 April 1855
Brigadier General, Volunteer Army – 1 May 1862
Lieutenant Commander – 16 July 1862
Brevet Major General – Volunteer Army – 13 March 1865
Commander – 25 June 1865
Mustered out of Volunteer Army – 15 January 1866
Captain – 28 October 1870
Commodore – 13 November 1878
Retired List – 6 August 1881
Rear Admiral on Retired List – 16 May 1882

See also

 List of American Civil War generals (Union)

Notes

References
 Eicher, John H., and Eicher, David J., Civil War High Commands, Stanford University Press, 2001, .
 McHenry, Robert. Webster's American Military Biographies, Springfield, Mass.: G & C. Merriam Co., 1978.
 Piston, William Garrett, Carter's Raid: An Episode of the Civil War in East Tennessee, (Johnson City, Tenn.: The Overmountain Press, 1989).
 Temple, Oliver P.  Notable Men of Tennessee, New York: Cosmopolitan Press, 1912, p. 89.
 "A Sketch of the Military Services of Sam. P. Carter, Brig. Genl. & Brevt. Maj. Genl. of U.S. Vols. during the Rebellion of the Southern States, 1861–5." S.P. Carter Papers, 1882, MS 16,791, Library of Congress, Washington, DC. (1st Tenn. Inf. US, pp. 26–31)

External links

 Obituaries – Admiral Samuel P. Carter. The Washington Post, May 28, 1891.
 
 U.S. Naval Academy Alumni Association & Foundation – Commandants.
 WETS 89.5FM Public Radio – Carter at Main Restaurant (Samuel P. Carter House – location of Tennessee Historical Marker).
 Carter at Main Restaurant – Remodeling Pictures, Internet Archive. Retrieved November 4, 2015.
   Maryland State Archives Guide to Special Collections – Letters, Samuel P. Carter
 Journal of the executive proceedings of the Senate of the United States of America, 1861–1862 FRIDAY, March 21, 1862.
 TNGenWeb Project Tennesseans in the Civil War, 2ND TENNESSEE VOLUNTEER INFANTRY REGIMENT, U.S.A.
 TN Encyclopedia: CARTER MANSION
 eHistory.com – Search Results for 'S.P. Carter'
 eHistory.com – Search Results for 'Samuel P. Carter'

1819 births
1891 deaths
United States Navy personnel of the Mexican–American War
Union Army generals
United States Naval Academy alumni
United States Navy rear admirals (upper half)
People of Tennessee in the American Civil War
Southern Unionists in the American Civil War
People from Elizabethton, Tennessee
Burials at Oak Hill Cemetery (Washington, D.C.)